Marko Golubović (born 20 September 1995) is a Serbian professional footballer who plays as a winger for Timok.

Club career

Partizan
Born Majdanpek, Golubović joined Partizan at the age of 9. After the youth categories, he was with Teleoptik for 2 seasons. In his first season with Teleoptik, Golubović made 24 league appearances and also played 1 cup match. After the club got relegated from the Serbian First League, Golubović noted 8 goals on 19 Serbian League Belgrade matches for the 2014–15 season. He also appeared for the club in the spring half of the 2015–16 season, on dual registration.

He signed his first professional contract with Partizan on 10 July 2015, and took the jersey number 80. Golubović made his Serbian SuperLiga debut in the 3rd fixture of the 2015–16 Serbian SuperLiga, against Novi Pazar. In the summer of 2016, Golubović moved to Sinđelić Beograd on a one-year loan. After making 17 appearances and scoring 2 goals in all competitions for the club, Golubović terminated his contract with Partizan and left as a free agent in July 2017.

Radnički Niš
Several days after he left Partizan, Golubović signed a three-year contract with Radnički Niš. He made his debut for the club in a 3–0 defeat against Red Star Belgrade in the first fixture of the 2017–18 Serbian SuperLiga season, played on 23 July 2017 at the Rajko Mitić Stadium.

Krupa
On 11 August 2019, Golubović signed a contract with, at the time, First League of RS club Krupa. On 8 May 2020, the 2019–20 First League of RS season ended abruptly due to the COVID-19 pandemic in Bosnia and Herzegovina and by default, Golubović with Krupa, were crowned league champions and got promoted back to the Bosnian Premier League. He terminated his contract with the club on 19 December 2020.

International career
In 2016, Golubović represented the Serbia U21 national team, making one appearance.

Career statistics

Club

Honours
Partizan
Serbian Cup: 2015–16

Krupa
First League of RS: 2019–20

References

External links

Marko Golubović stats at utakmica.rs

1995 births
People from Majdanpek
Living people
Serbian footballers
Association football forwards
Serbia under-21 international footballers
FK Teleoptik players
FK Partizan players
FK Sinđelić Beograd players
FK Radnički Niš players
FK Krupa players
FK Sloga Doboj players
FK Timok players
Serbian First League players
Serbian SuperLiga players
First League of the Republika Srpska players
Premier League of Bosnia and Herzegovina players
Serbian expatriate footballers
Expatriate footballers in Bosnia and Herzegovina
Serbian expatriate sportspeople in Bosnia and Herzegovina